Epinotia pentagonana is a species of moth of the family Tortricidae. It is found in China (Jilin), Korea, Japan and Russia.

The wingspan is 14–17 mm.

The larvae feed on Ulmus laciniata.

References

Moths described in 1901
Eucosmini